The women's triple jump event  at the 2011 European Athletics Indoor Championships was held at March 4, 2011 at 09:00 (qualification) and March 5, 14:45 (final) local time.

Records

Results

Qualification
Qualification: Qualification Performance 14.10 (Q) or at least 8 best performers advanced to the final. It was held at 09:00.

Final
The Final was held at 14:45.

References

Triple jump at the European Athletics Indoor Championships
2011 European Athletics Indoor Championships
2011 in women's athletics